William Aide (born 27 March 1938) is a Canadian pianist. He is a pupil of Alberto Guerrero. He has played with conductors Sir Andrew Davis, Arthur Fiedler and Walter Susskind. He has accompanied Lois Marshall. Glenn Gould called him one of "the most inventive and imaginative pianistic talents of our time."

References 

1938 births
Living people
Canadian classical pianists